Bansh Baria (Indian Railway Station code – BSAE) or Bansberia railway station is railway station on Bandel–Katwa line, in Bengal, India connecting from  to Katwa, and under the jurisdiction of Howrah railway division of Eastern Railway zone. It is situated at Bansberia, Hooghly district in the Indian state of West Bengal. The distance between Howrah and Bansberia railway station is approximately 44 km.

History 
The Hooghly–Katwa Railway constructed a line from Bandel to Katwa in 1913. This line including Bans Beria railway station was electrified in 1994–96 with 25 kV overhead line.

References 

Railway stations in Hooghly district
Kolkata Suburban Railway stations
Howrah railway division